Gäddvik can refer to the following places:
 Gäddvik, the Swedish name for the district of Haukilahti in Espoo, Finland
 Gäddvik, Luleå, a village in Luleå Municipality, Sweden